Anna Maria Bligh  (born 14 July 1960) is a lobbyist and former Australian politician who served as the 37th Premier of Queensland, in office from 2007 to 2012 as leader of the Labor Party. She was the first woman to hold either position. In 2017, she was appointed CEO of the Australian Banking Association.

Bligh was born in Warwick, Queensland, and studied at the University of Queensland. Before entering politics she worked for various community organisations. Bligh entered the Queensland Legislative Assembly at the 1995 state election, winning the seat of South Brisbane. She was promoted to the ministry in 1998, under Peter Beattie, and became deputy premier in 2005 and state treasurer in 2006. Bligh succeeded Beattie as premier in 2007 – Queensland's first female premier and Australia's third. She led Labor to victory at the 2009 state election, but at the 2012 election suffered a landslide defeat and announced her retirement from politics. From 2010 to 2011, Bligh was National President of the Australian Labor Party.

Early life
Bligh was born in Warwick, Queensland. She is a descendant of William Bligh, who is famous for the Mutiny on the Bounty and being the 4th Governor of New South Wales. Bligh grew up on the Gold Coast. Her parents separated when she was 13. She attended Catholic schools until Year 9 and considered becoming a nun. One of her aunts became a nun and another had entered a convent. However, the church's attitude towards divorced people (her mother was no longer permitted to take Communion) reportedly estranged her and her mother from the church.

Studying at the University of Queensland from 1978, Bligh gained a Bachelor of Arts.  Bligh traces her politicisation to her first year at University, observing a right-to-march rally in King George Square where people were being hit over the head by the police.  Bligh's first involvement in activism was student protests against the Vice-Chancellor Brian Wilson's controversial administrative restructuring within the university.  She then went on to be involved in the Women's Rights Collective which campaigned for legalised abortion against the anti-abortion policies of the Bjelke-Petersen government. Bligh's next role was as Women's vice-president of the Student Union.  She then ran an election ticket called EAT (Education Action Team) in an unsuccessful bid to oust the faction in charge, headed by the future Goss government identity David Barbagallo. Law student Paul Lucas, Bligh's future deputy premier, was a part of Barbagallo's team.  Her 1982 team included the former Minister for Education, Training and the Arts Rod Welford. Anne Warner, who was a future Minister in the Goss Government, was an office holder at the time in the Union.  Warner soon become one of Bligh's key political mentors.

She subsequently worked in a number of community organisations, including child care services, neighbourhood centres, women's refuges and trade unions as well as in the Queensland Public Service.

Bligh was the secretary of the Labor Party's Fairfield branch in 1987.

Parliament

Bligh was first elected to parliament at the 1995 election to the safe Labor seat of South Brisbane, succeeding Anne Warner. A member of the Socialist Left faction of the Labor Party, she was promoted to the ministry following the election of the Beattie government in 1998 as Minister for Families, Youth and Community Care and Disability Services. In 2001, Bligh became Queensland's first female Education Minister. She assumed additional responsibility for the Arts portfolio in 2004.

Education Minister

As Education Minister, Bligh introduced a number of reforms, including a universally available Prep year in every Queensland Primary school, which added a thirteenth year of education and brought Queensland schooling into line with other Australian States for the first time. She lifted the entry age of schooling, while also transforming early childhood education which led to an increase in kindergarten programs from 28% of 3-4 year olds to 94%.

Bligh also oversaw the introduction of “Earning or Learning” laws, requiring all young people aged 15 to 17 to be enrolled in school or in full-time work – effectively lifting the school leaving age from 15 to 17  - the first such laws in Australia.

Deputy Premier

In July 2005, the retirement of the Deputy Premier and Treasurer Terry Mackenroth forced a cabinet reshuffle, which saw Bligh promoted to the office of Deputy Premier and Minister for Finance, State Development, Trade and Innovation. Bligh's appointment as Deputy Premier coincided with her election to parliament ten years earlier. In early February 2006, Bligh also gained the Treasury portfolio after Beattie relinquished the responsibility to focus on attempting to fix the state's troubled health system.

Premier
Bligh had long been touted as a likely successor to the long-running Premier Peter Beattie, and he publicly endorsed her as his replacement when he announced his retirement from politics on 10 September 2007.

She was subsequently nominated unopposed by the Labor caucus in a deal that saw Paul Lucas from the Right faction succeed her as Deputy Premier. She became the leader of the Labor Party on 12 September. After Beattie formally resigned on 13 September 2007, Bligh was sworn in by the then Governor Quentin Bryce. Bligh led Labor to victory in the 2009 state election.  Bligh lost eight seats from the large majority she'd inherited from Beattie, and also suffered an eight-percent swing on the two-party vote.  Nonetheless, due largely to taking 34 out of 40 seats in Brisbane, Labor still won 51 seats out of 89, enough for a comfortable majority. The election marked the Queensland ALP's eighth consecutive election win; the party has been in government for all but two years since 1989.

In winning the election, Bligh became Australia's first popularly elected female premier. The two previous female premiers, Carmen Lawrence (Western Australia 1990–93) and Joan Kirner (Victoria 1990–92), became premiers following the resignation of male premiers (as Bligh did), but both were defeated at the following respective state elections. However, Bligh is not Australia's first popularly elected female head of government. Rosemary Follett and Kate Carnell were both popularly elected as Chief Minister of the Australian Capital Territory, and Clare Martin was elected as Chief Minister of the Northern Territory.

In 2009, Bligh was elected to the three person presidential team of the Australian Labor Party, to serve until July 2012. She served as National President of the Australian Labor Party for the 2010–11 financial year.

Queensland Floods

Anna Bligh's leadership came to national and international attention in 2011 as she led the response and recovery effort to devastating natural disasters - a series of catastrophic floods across 78% of Queensland, including Brisbane - followed by a category 5 cyclone.

In an emotion-charged speech during a media conference at the height of the crisis, Bligh rallied the state, declaring, "We are Queenslanders. We're the people that they breed tough, north of the border."

Bligh led a major reconstruction program, including a legislated Reconstruction Authority administering a $6bn rebuilding budget.

Economic Reform

As Treasurer and Premier, Bligh held responsibility for a state budget of almost $50 billion. Her reforms include:

 Australia's largest infrastructure building program, averaging $15bn (AUD)/year, including new export chain capacity, major new roads and public transport infrastructure and a $9bn ‘Water grid’ connecting water storages and constructing new water sources, including a recycled water scheme and a desalination plant to drought proof Queensland's major urban populations.
 Major reform of utilities, including the amalgamation of water authorities into a framework structured into supply, distribution and retail corporations of government and the restructure of electricity supply to provide for private commercial retailers, including the sale of Queensland's electricity retailer.
 New investments into research, science and innovation – shifting a predominantly resource economy to a knowledge-based, creative economy - this 10-year program of investment saw the establishment of 36 new science research institutes and the ratio of scientists and researchers to population grow faster than any other state.
 Privatisation of the bulk freight and coal division of the government-owned railway business in 2010.
 Significant new investment in the Arts, including the construction of a new Gallery of Modern Art (GOMA) and other cultural infrastructure, which saw an increase in cultural tourism. These new investments, including additional funding support for the performing arts and major exhibitions, heralded a renaissance in Queensland's arts and cultural sector with the Queensland Art Gallery now being the most visited museum in the country.
 Bligh led the successful bid for the Gold Coast to host the 2018 Commonwealth Games.

Social Policy

As Minister for Families, Youth and Community Care and Disability Services and later as Premier, Bligh oversaw a number of changes, including;

 Implementation of Queensland's first stand-alone Disability Services agency, accompanied by a tripling of budget expenditure to services for people with a disability
 Australia's first Royal Commission of Inquiry into Historical Abuse in Orphanages and Institutions, resulting in a compensation scheme, a dedicated counselling service and beneficial foundation for victims
 Welfare reforms in remote indigenous communities, linking welfare payments with school attendance, alcohol rehabilitation and counselling programs
 Legislated a Preamble to the Queensland Constitution formally recognising Aboriginal and Torres Strait Islanders, Queensland's indigenous peoples, as first custodians
 The first complete overhaul of Queensland's Child Protection legislation in more than 40 years
 Introduction of significant new legal protections for those experiencing domestic violence, including in same sex relationships, and carer and elder abuse
 New laws to provide for same sex civil unions
 Introduction of fluoride into all Queensland drinking water supplies

Privatisation
Bligh announced the privatisation of five government owned corporations:
Queensland Motorways Limited (Operating the Gateway Bridge and Logan Motorway tolling systems)
The Port of Brisbane Authority
Forestry Plantations Queensland
Abbot Point Coal Terminal
Coal-carrying rail lines, currently owned by Queensland Rail (QR Passenger services will remain nationalised).
More than 3,000 workers were to be offered voluntary redundancies, just three months after the privatisation of QR National.

Queensland Motorways Limited and Forestry Plantations Queensland were not being sold, but rather being leased for an estimated 50-year lease. Since this announcement, the Queensland Government announced plans to sell Queensland Rail to the public.

Revenues from privatisation were estimated at $15 billion, to go towards balancing Queensland's state budget.

The sale of these assets aimed at removing significant overheads from the Queensland government's debt portfolio, allowing further growth of the government's capital assets, as well as aiding the government to return to its AAA credit rating. Bligh faced resistance from both within her party and the trade union movement, but defended her privatisation plan as 'not negotiable'.

The 2009 annual state conference of the Australian Labor Party – Queensland Branch, passed a motion, moved by then Treasurer Andrew Fraser MP, seconded by Parliamentary Secretary for Healthy Living Murray Watt MP, supporting the sale of the assets, recognising that the sale would allow the Queensland Government to grow its asset portfolio, and retire debt.

2012 election

Bligh's management of and performance during the 2010–11 Queensland floods was widely approved. Labor had been well behind the LNP, led by John-Paul Langbroek, for most of the time since the fall of 2010. However, the following Newspoll saw a record turnaround in Bligh and Labor's fortunes.  Labor rose from a two-party deficit of 41–59 to a lead of 52–48, with Bligh's personal satisfaction-dissatisfaction standing going from a negative 24–67 to a positive 49–43. Bligh's recovery in the polls was a factor behind Langbroek being forced to stand down in favour of Brisbane Lord Mayor Campbell Newman. Newman had become a national figure during the floods, and polling showed he was the only non-Labor politician who even came close to matching Bligh's popularity during that time.

However, Newman was not a member of parliament, and a by-election could not be arranged to allow him to get a seat in the chamber.  For this reason, Jeff Seeney was elected as interim parliamentary leader of the LNP while Newman led the LNP's election team and simultaneously contested the Labor-held seat of Ashgrove. Bligh harshly criticised Newman's move, saying it was irresponsible for Newman to "cut and run" from his post as Lord Mayor while Queensland was still rebuilding. She also hinted that she might call an election a year before it was due.  She had previously promised not to call an election for 2011 to focus on recovery, but was concerned that the unorthodox leadership arrangement on the opposition side could make the co-operation necessary for the recovery effort impossible.

On 25 January, Bligh announced an election for 24 March.  It was the first time in Queensland history that the voters knew the election date in advance of the parliament being dissolved.  Bligh made this decision after learning that the Commission of Inquiry into the 2010–11 Queensland floods would not release its final report until 16 March, rather than the middle of February as originally planned.  She wanted Queenslanders to see the report before they went to the polls.

Bligh asked Governor Penny Wensley to dissolve parliament on 19 February, formally beginning the 35-day campaign. She began the race as an underdog; the LNP had regained a substantial lead in polling since Newman took the leadership.

Bligh was dogged throughout the campaign by the perception that she'd misled voters about the asset sales.  With Labor sinking in the polls, Bligh conceded in a 13 March interview with the Brisbane Times that in all likelihood, Labor would not be re-elected. The final Newspoll of the campaign appeared to confirm this, showing Labor's support had sunk to only 39.2 percent.

At 24 March election, Labor suffered one of the largest electoral wipeouts in Australian history, and the worst defeat that a sitting government in Queensland has ever suffered, double the previous record-holder of the 1989 election. Labor was reduced from 51 seats to seven, suffering a swing of more than 15 points.  This was largely because of a near-total meltdown in Brisbane, which had been Labor's power base for over two decades.  The party lost all but three of its seats in the capital, in some cases suffering swings of over 10 percent.  Bligh herself suffered a 9-point swing in South Brisbane, and she only overcame her LNP challenger on Green preferences.  Ten members of her cabinet were defeated.  It was only the sixth time since 1915 that Queenslanders have thrown a government from office in an election.

The next day, with Labor's defeat beyond doubt, Bligh announced she was retiring from politics. She had intended to stay in parliament, but said that the severity of Labor's defeat made her realise the party could not "develop an effective opposition" with her even as a backbencher. She resigned as both premier and state Labor leader that day, and handed her resignation to Wensley the same afternoon, to take effect from 30 March 2012. Bligh had intended that the timing of her resignation would allow a by-election to be held on 28 April 2012, the same day as local government elections. She was ultimately succeeded as state Labor leader by her Transport Minister, Annastacia Palaszczuk.

Later reports suggested that Bligh would not be able to formally resign from Parliament until the writ of election for South Brisbane was returned, meaning that a by-election would be too late to coincide with the Brisbane City Council election. But on 2 April, she was declared the winner, and a writ was subsequently issued for the by-election.

After politics
In 2014, Bligh was appointed CEO of YWCA New South Wales., a not-for-profit organisation striving to end domestic violence and build a safer world for women and children.  
In 2017, she was made CEO of the Australian Banking Association.

As CEO, Bligh led the industry's response to the Royal Commission into Misconduct in the Banking, Superannuation and Financial Services Industry, setting out to strengthen bank culture and rebuild trust.

When the Royal Commission interim report was released, Bligh described it as a “day of shame” for the industry and vowed to do “whatever it takes” to regain trust and move the industry from a selling culture to a service culture.

She oversaw the development of an updated Banking Code of Practice and worked with the industry to deliver significant reform.

In 2020, Bligh led the banking sector's response to COVID-19. For the first time, Australian banks agreed to a unified response to assist customers experiencing hardship as a result of the pandemic. Banks agreed to pause loan repayments on almost one million mortgage and business loans for at least six months. The ABA also worked with regulators to ensure that deferred loans would not affect a customer's credit rating. Bligh described the loan deferrals as “a multi-billion dollar lifeline” for customers.

Bligh attributed the banks’ response to COVID-19 to their strong “financial firepower” and their role in the wake of the Royal Commission.

Personal

On 8 June 2013, Bligh announced that she had been diagnosed with non-Hodgkin lymphoma.

Bligh's memoir, "Through The Wall", was published in April 2015.

In 2017 Bligh was appointed a Companion of the Order of Australia for eminent service to the Parliament of Queensland, particularly as Premier, to infrastructure development and education reform, as an advocate for the role of women in public life, and to the not-for-profit sector.

Bligh holds Honorary Doctorates from the University of Queensland and Griffith University. 

She is a non-executive director of Medibank Private and a board member of the International Banking Federation (IBFed).

See also
 2012 Queensland state election
 Bligh ministry
 List of female heads of government in Australia

References

External links

Official Website
Campaign Website
Parliamentary Biography
Anna Bligh's response to the 2008 Apology
 

Premiers of Queensland
1960 births
Living people
Companions of the Order of Australia
Deputy Premiers of Queensland
Members of the Queensland Legislative Assembly
University of Queensland alumni
Treasurers of Queensland
MasterChef Australia
Labor Left politicians
Australian Labor Party members of the Parliament of Queensland
Australian people of Cornish descent
20th-century Australian politicians
21st-century Australian politicians
20th-century Australian women politicians
21st-century Australian women politicians
Women heads of government of Australian states and territories
Women members of the Queensland Legislative Assembly